Constitución District is one of eight districts of the province Oxapampa in Peru. Its capital is the town of Ciudad Constitucion.

References